The following is a list of the 25 cantons of the Dordogne department, in France, following the French canton reorganisation which came into effect in March 2015:

 Bergerac-1
 Bergerac-2
 Brantôme en Périgord
 Coulounieix-Chamiers
 Haut-Périgord Noir
 Isle-Loue-Auvézère
 Isle-Manoire
 Lalinde
 Montpon-Ménestérol
 Pays de la Force
 Pays de Montaigne et Gurson
 Périgord Central
 Périgord Vert Nontronnais
 Périgueux-1
 Périgueux-2
 Ribérac
 Saint-Astier
 Sarlat-la-Canéda
 Sud-Bergeracois
 Terrasson-Lavilledieu
 Thiviers
 Trélissac
 Vallée Dordogne
 Vallée de l'Isle
 Vallée de l'Homme

References